Hindrek Ojamaa (born 12 June 1995) is an Estonian professional footballer who plays as a right back for Estonian club Paide Linnameeskond and the Estonia national team.

Club career

Levadia
Ojamaa first played for Kotkas Junior, and joined the Levadia youth academy in 2006 when Kotkas Junior merged with Levadia. He made his debut in the Meistriliiga on 10 September 2011, in a 6–0 home victory over Ajax and scored his first Meistriliiga goal three days later, in a 7–0 away win over the same team.

Nõmme Kalju
On 1 March 2013, Ojamaa signed a three-year contract with Nõmme Kalju. He mainly played for the club's reserve side, Nõmme Kalju II, making only a single Meistriliiga appearance for the first team.

Tammeka
On 18 July 2014, Ojamaa joined Tammeka for the remainder of the 2014 season.

Return to Levadia
On 5 March 2015, Ojamaa returned to Levadia on a two-year contract.

JJK
On 20 July 2017, Ojamaa joined Finnish Veikkausliiga club JJK for the remainder of the 2017 season. He made his debut in the Veikkausliiga on 23 July 2017, in a 1–1 away draw against VPS.

VPS
On 16 December 2017, Ojamaa signed a two-year contract with VPS.

Paide Linnameeskond
On 3 January 2021, Ojamaa returned to Estonia signing for Paide Linnameeskond.

International career
Ojamaa began his youth career in 2010 with the under-16 team. He also represented the under-17, under-18, under-19, under-21, and under-23 national sides.

Ojamaa made his senior international debut for Estonia on 6 January 2016, in a 1–1 draw against Sweden in a friendly.

Personal life
Ojamaa has two older brothers. Henrik is also a professional footballer, while Harri ended his football career at the age of 19 due to an injury and is now a sports agent.

References

External links

1995 births
Living people
Footballers from Tallinn
Estonian footballers
Association football defenders
Esiliiga players
FCI Levadia U21 players
Meistriliiga players
FCI Levadia Tallinn players
Nõmme Kalju FC players
Tartu JK Tammeka players
Veikkausliiga players
JJK Jyväskylä players
Vaasan Palloseura players
Estonia youth international footballers
Estonia under-21 international footballers
Estonia international footballers
Estonian expatriate footballers
Estonian expatriate sportspeople in Finland
Expatriate footballers in Finland
Paide Linnameeskond players